Troy Hill is a neighborhood on Pittsburgh, Pennsylvania's North Side.  It has a zip code of 15212, and has representation on Pittsburgh City Council by the council member for District 1.

Troy Hill sits on a plateau above the Allegheny River.

History
Troy Hill was originally part of the Reserve Tract laid out by surveyor and Pennsylvania Vice-President David Redick in 1788. Incorporated in 1833 as the village of New Troy, it was settled by German immigrants who worked in the mills, tanneries, breweries, and railroads that lined the Allegheny River. The migration up to Troy Hill began when a Catholic church opened a small cemetery in 1842. By 1866 one hundred families were officially Troy Hill residents. The adjacent riverfront land along with Herr's Island would in 1849 be incorporated into the short-lived Duquesne borough (distinct from the modern borough of the same name), that in 1868 was partitioned, the portion upriver of the northern end of Herr's Island becoming part of the newly-formed borough of Millvale, while the downriver portion including the island was annexed to the City of Allegheny as its 8th ward. The upland including the village of Troy Hill was also annexed, forming part of the 7th ward, and following an 1877 redistricting became the city's 13th ward. When Allegheny was annexed by Pittsburgh in 1907, most of its 8th and 13th wards became Pittsburgh's 24th ward, roughly corresponding to the modern Troy Hill neighborhood.

Troy Hill is home to six historic landmarks: the Troy Hill Firehouse, Saint Anthony's Chapel, the Rectory of Most Holy Name of Jesus, the Troy Hill Incline Building, the Allegheny Reservoir Wall, and the Ober-Guehl house.

In the 1830s, Troy Hill's population escalated significantly, resulting in the need of a school. In 1836, a 1-room brick school house was built in "New Troy" and named Mount Troy School #1, because at the time it was located in Reserve Township. It was sold in 1860, which then was replaced by a new, 2 room brick school house. A decade after the civil war, the pupils increased to around 200, so 2 more rooms were added in 1874. Troy Hill was now part of Allegheny's School System, and in 1883 the school was demolished and a new one was built in its place. That building was then also replaced by the Troy Hill School of 1907, but then was shut down in 1960 and demolished. The site of the original school is now a community park.

Troy Hill was the home to Commissioner Thomas J. Foerster who served 10 years in the state house and 28 years as the Commissioner of Allegheny County.  He also served on the first county council established in 2000. Another notable resident was Andrew (Huck) Fenrich who served 9 terms in the state house, was executive secretary for the mayor of Pittsburgh, and also served as executive secretary for the Allegheny County Democrats.

Until 1959 the neighborhood was served by the 4 Troy Hill trolley operated by Pittsburgh Railways.

Beginning in 2013, Evan Mirapaul, an art collector living in Troy Hill, commissioned two whole-house installations in the neighborhood. Both La Hutte Royal, created by German artist Thorsten Brinkmann, and Kunzhaus, by Polish artist Robert Kusmirowski, are free to tour by appointment.

Other names
While "Troy Hill" generally refers to the historically German neighborhood atop the Troy Hill plateau, the neighborhood's boundaries also encompass the narrow and flat river plain that sits between the plateau and the Allegheny River, formerly part of the Borough of Duquesne. , this river plain is dominated by Pennsylvania Route 28, an expressway which begins at East Ohio Street and then follows the river north.  But before Route 28 became an expressway, this plain was a Croatian neighborhood that was settled by immigrants from Jastrebarsko, who called the neighborhood "Mala Jaska" and founded St. Nicholas Parish, and "Bohemian Hill" to the Southwest.

Troy Hill in Hollywood Films 
Several Hollywood films have scenes filmed in Troy Hill, including Hoffa (1992), Innocent Blood (1992), Striking Distance (1993), and Adventureland (2009).

Surrounding and adjacent neighborhoods
Troy Hill has five borders including the Pittsburgh neighborhoods of Spring Garden to the north and northwest, East Allegheny to the west, and North Shore to the southwest as well as Reserve Township to the north-northwest and the borough of Millvale to the northeast.  Troy Hill is also adjacent to the Strip District across the Allegheny River with a direct link via 31st Street Bridge.

City Steps
The Troy Hill neighborhood has 11 distinct flights of city steps, many of which are open and in a safe condition. In Troy Hill, the Steps of Pittsburgh quickly connect pedestrians to public transportation and the East Ohio Street trail.

Gallery

See also
List of Pittsburgh neighborhoods

References

External links

Interactive Pittsburgh Neighborhoods Map
Troy Hill Citizens, Inc.
nextpittsburgh.com - Things to do in Troy Hill

 
1833 establishments in Pennsylvania
Croatian-American culture in Pennsylvania
German-American culture in Pittsburgh
Neighborhoods in Pittsburgh